Dr. Baldev Prakash (1922 – 1992) was a leader of Bharatiya Janata Party from Punjab, India. He was a member of 6th Lok Sabha elected  from Amritsar. He was a member of Punjab Legislative Assembly from 1957 to 1969 and 1974–77 and was president, state unit of Jan Sangh from 1964 to 1974. He served as minister of Finance in Government of Punjab, India in 1967 in Gurnam Singh led cabinet. Baldev Prakash also represented Punjab in Rajya Sabha in 1992. He had studied M.B.B.S.

References

1922 births
1992 deaths
Politicians from Amritsar
Punjab, India MLAs 1957–1962
State cabinet ministers of Punjab, India
Lok Sabha members from Punjab, India
Rajya Sabha members from Uttar Pradesh
India MPs 1977–1979
Bharatiya Jana Sangh politicians
Bharatiya Janata Party politicians from Punjab
Janata Party politicians
Members of the Punjab Legislative Assembly
Rajya Sabha members from the Bharatiya Janata Party
Punjab, India MLAs 1962–1967
Punjab, India MLAs 1967–1972